The enzyme hydroxyacylglutathione hydrolase (EC 3.1.2.6, systematic name = S-(2-hydroxyacyl)glutathione hydrolase) catalyzes the following reaction:

S-(2-hydroxyacyl)glutathione + H2O = glutathione + a 2-hydroxy carboxylate

This enzyme belongs to the family of hydrolases, specifically the class of thioester lyases.  It is commonly known as glyoxalase II.  It participates in pyruvate metabolism.

References

EC 3.1.2
Enzymes of known structure